Abdelaye Diakité (born 8 January 1990) is a French footballer who plays for Nea Salamis in Cyprus.

Biography
Born in Les Mureaux, a suburb of Paris, Diakité started his career at Le Havre. He was a player for their B team from 2008 to 2010 in Championnat de France amateur. In 2009, he received his only France national under-20 football team call-up, against Morocco. He was an unused bench. After a season long injury, Diakité moved to Italy in 2011 for the fourth division club Aprilia. In March 2013 Diakité signed a pre-contract with Parma. However, in July 2013 half of the registration rights was swapped with half of the "card" of Crotone player Giuseppe Caccavallo. Diakité was trained separately from the squad since 21 July due to fitness problem.

On 30 August 2013 Diakité left for Slovenian club Gorica. The paperwork of his transfer was completed on 24 October. In January 2014 the temporary deal was terminated. During 2013 financial year the co-ownership between Crotone and Parma also terminated in favour of Parma, with Giuseppe Prestia moved to Crotone.

On 18 July 2014 he was signed by Teramo along with Gianluca Lapadula.

On 20 August 2015 he was signed by Bylis.

On 15 September 2018, he engaged with Libyan club Al Ahli SC Tripoli.

Honours
FC U Craiova 1948
Liga II: 2020–21

References

External links
 AIC profile (data by www.football.it) 

French footballers
Le Havre AC players
F.C. Crotone players
ND Gorica players
KF Bylis Ballsh players
S.S. Teramo Calcio players
Siracusa Calcio players
Al-Ahli SC (Tripoli) players
Alki Oroklini players
Serie C players
Kategoria Superiore players
Cypriot First Division players
TFF First League players
Liga II players
FC U Craiova 1948 players
Nea Salamis Famagusta FC players
Association football central defenders
French expatriate sportspeople in Italy
French expatriate sportspeople in Slovenia
French expatriate sportspeople in Albania
French expatriate sportspeople in Cyprus
French expatriate sportspeople in Turkey
French expatriate sportspeople in Romania
Expatriate footballers in Italy
Expatriate footballers in Slovenia
Expatriate footballers in Albania
Expatriate footballers in Cyprus
Expatriate footballers in Turkey
Expatriate footballers in Romania
French expatriate footballers
French people of Malian descent
Footballers from Yvelines
1990 births
Living people
Libyan Premier League players